Rusinowa (former, German name: Reußendorf) is a town of Poland and now part of the town Wałbrzych. It was first mentioned in a Latin document Liber fundationis episcopatus Vratislaviensis from around 1305 as villa ottonis; since the end of the 14th century, it is called "Reußendorf"; in 1945 it was renamed "Rusinowa".

The "castle" of Carl Robert Tielsch is located in Rusinowa; after the polish transition in 1945, it served as an orphanage and a school.

The organist Gerhard Schwarz was born in the city in 1902.

References

External links
Pictures

Wałbrzych